Broomia is an extinct genus of millerettid parareptile from the Middle Permian (Capitanian stage) of South Africa. It was originally described by D. M. S. Watson.

References

Parareptiles
Permian reptiles of Africa
Prehistoric reptile genera